Adolph G. "Ade" Sieberts (August 29, 1893 – April 28, 1968) was an American basketball player, known best for his college career where he was Oregon State University's first All-American in the sport.

Sports career

Sieberts, a forward from Portland, Oregon, went to Oregon Agricultural College (now Oregon State University) where he played basketball and baseball. As a basketball player, he led the Aggies to a Pacific Coast Conference (now known as the Pac-12 Conference) championship and was named first-team all-conference. He was also named an All-American by the Helms Athletic Foundation for his 1915–16 junior season.

Sieberts quit the Aggies' basketball team during his senior season to enter the business world. Despite this he was named to the PCC all-conference team for the second consecutive season.

References

1893 births
1968 deaths
All-American college men's basketball players
Basketball players from Portland, Oregon
Forwards (basketball)
Oregon State Beavers baseball players
Oregon State Beavers men's basketball players
American men's basketball players